The 2007 Men's Ice Hockey World Championships was the 71st World Ice Hockey Championship. The competition also served as qualification for division placements in the 2008 competition. Canada won the tournament, receiving the gold medal for the 24th time.

Championship

Final standings
 
 
 
 
 
 
 
 
 
 
 
 
 
 
  — relegated to Division I for 2008
  — relegated to Division I for 2008

Division I

Group A 
Final standings
  — promoted to Championship for 2008
 
 
 
 
  — relegated to Division II for 2008

Group B 
Final standings
  — promoted to Championship for 2008
 
 
 
 
  — relegated to Division II for 2008

Division II

Group A 
Final standings
  — promoted to Division I for 2008
 
 
 
 
  — relegated to Division III for 2008

Group B 
Final standings
  — promoted to Division I for 2008
 
 
 
 
  — withdrew from tournament, relegated to Division III for 2008

Division III 

Final standings
  — promoted to Division II for 2008
  — promoted to Division II for 2008
 
 
  — made first appearance
  — withdrew from tournament

See also
2007 IIHF World Championship rosters
 Juniors
 Women's
 Men's U18

External links 
IIHF Official Site

 
IIHF Men's World Ice Hockey Championships
Men's, World 2007